Socialist Unity (US) was a Spanish party alliance formed to contest the 1977 general election by the People's Socialist Party (PSP) of Enrique Tierno Galván and the Federation of Socialist Parties (FPS).

After the PSP and most of the parties within the FPS merged with the Spanish Socialist Workers' Party (PSOE) throughout 1978, the majority of US deputies and senators were absorbed into PSOE's parliamentary groups in the Congress and Senate.

Member parties
People's Socialist Party (PSP)
Federation of Socialist Parties (FPS)
Socialist Party of Andalusia (PSA)
Socialist Party of Aragon (PSAr)
Autonomist Socialist Party of Canaries (PSAC)
Socialist Party of the Murcian Region (PSRM)
Socialist Party of the Islands (PSI)
Socialist Movement of Menorca (MSM)
Socialist Party of the Valencian Country (PSPV)

Election results

References

Defunct political party alliances in Spain
Socialist parties in Spain
Spanish Socialist Workers' Party